The Small Business, Enterprise and Employment Act 2015, also referred to as SBEE, received Royal Assent in March 2015. Its contents include regulatory reform (part 2), public sector procurement (part 3) and company director disqualification issues (part 9).

Business impact target
Part 2 contained provision for the government to publish a "business impact target", which is Statutory guidance on this duty was published in January 2019.

Public sector procurement
Part 3 concerns powers to make further regulations regarding public sector procurement, including processes for entering into contracts and contract management (section 39) and investigations into procurement functions (section 40). One of the particular objectives underlying potential regulations would be to ensure that procurement functions are exercised in an efficient and timely manner.

Examples of public sector purchasing practices identified in a Cabinet Office consultation regarding the proposed legislation in 2014, before it was enacted, included over-complicating requirements and 'gold-plating' specifications, being over-prescriptive for lower value procurements, complex tender documentation, and making inappropriate use of framework agreements when they can be a barrier for small businesses, and internal decision making procedures.

Company directors
On 1 October 2015, Part 9 of the Act came into force, which amended the Company Directors Disqualification Act 1986 to introduce:

 inclusion of relevant foreign offences as grounds for disqualification (s. 104)
 extension of the régime to persons instructing unfit directors of insolvent companies (s. 105)
 revision of the procedure for determining the unfitness of directors and shadow directors (s. 106)
 requirements for official receivers, liquidators, administrators and administrative receivers to report to the Secretary of State on the conduct of each person who was a director of a company on the insolvency date or within the three years before (s. 107)
 provision for compensation orders and undertakings on persons who are subject to disqualification orders or undertakings, where the person's conduct as a director caused loss to one or more creditors during the time he was a director of an insolvent company (s. 110)

References

United Kingdom company law
Corporate directors